Wolverine and the X-Men may refer to:

 Wolverine and the X-Men (comics)
 Wolverine and the X-Men (TV series)

See also
 Wolverine (disambiguation)
X-Men (disambiguation)